Jan Jones may refer to:

Jan Jones (novelist) (born 1955), software engineer and novelist
Jan Jones (Georgia politician) (born 1958), state representative in the U.S. state of Georgia
Jan Laverty Jones (born 1949), mayor of Las Vegas 1991–1999

See also
Janet Jones (disambiguation)